Kyle John McFadzean (born 28 February 1987) is an English professional footballer who plays as a centre back for  club Coventry City.

Club career

Sheffield United
Born in Sheffield, South Yorkshire, McFadzean was a member of Sheffield United's academy before being given a squad number for the 2005–06 season despite playing the majority of the campaign in the reserves. He made his first-team debut as a substitute in place of Keith Gillespie in a League Cup tie against Shrewsbury Town on 20 September 2005.

Alfreton Town
He signed for Conference North club Alfreton Town on a free transfer in July 2007.

Crawley Town
On 20 August 2010, McFadzean signed for Conference Premier club Crawley Town for an undisclosed fee, making his debut as a substitute in Crawley's 1–0 away win at Altrincham. He was named in the Conference Premier Team of the Year for the 2010–11 season after Crawley won the title and so promotion to League Two.

Milton Keynes Dons
On 20 June 2014, McFadzean signed for Milton Keynes Dons from Crawley Town for an undisclosed fee, on a two-year deal with an option of a third year. He scored in his league debut against Gillingham capitalising off fellow new signing Danny Green's cross. The match ended a 4–2 victory to the Dons. On top of that, in his cup debut he scored with a back-heel in what ended up being a 3–1 win over fierce rivals AFC Wimbledon he was awarded the man-of-the-match award.

Although he had signed a two-year contract extension seven months earlier to keep him at the club until June 2018, McFadzean made a transfer request at the end of the 2015–16 season following the club's relegation back to League One and failed to attend pre-season training with MK Dons.

Burton Albion
On 12 July 2016, McFadzean signed a three-year contract for newly promoted Championship club Burton Albion for a club record undisclosed fee. He scored his first goal for Burton in a 3–1 win over Sheffield Wednesday on 16 August 2016.

Coventry City
McFadzean signed for then League One club Coventry City on 9 May 2019 on a two-year contract. He scored his first goal for Coventry in a 3–2 win against Queens Park Rangers on 18 September 2020.

On 13 February 2023, McFadzean signed a new contract keeping him at the club until 2024.

International career
McFadzean gained England C recognition in September 2009, as he was called into the team that played against Hungary U23s, and then retained his place in the squad for a 2–1 victory in November over Poland U23s.

Personal life
Born in England, McFadzean is of Scottish descent. His younger brother Callum McFadzean is also a footballer.

Career statistics

Honours
Crawley Town
Conference Premier: 2010–11
Football League Two third-place promotion: 2011–12

Milton Keynes Dons
Football League One runner-up: 2014–15

Coventry City
Football League One Winner: 2019–20

Individual
Conference Premier Team of the Year: 2010–11
PFA Team of the Year: 2011–12 League Two

References

External links

Profile at the Coventry City F.C. website

1987 births
Living people
Footballers from Sheffield
English footballers
England semi-pro international footballers
English people of Scottish descent
Association football defenders
Sheffield United F.C. players
Alfreton Town F.C. players
Crawley Town F.C. players
Milton Keynes Dons F.C. players
Burton Albion F.C. players
Coventry City F.C. players
National League (English football) players
English Football League players